Castilla–La Mancha is an autonomous community of Spain. Comprising the provinces of Albacete, Ciudad Real, Cuenca, Guadalajara and Toledo, it was created in 1982. The government headquarters are in Toledo, and its largest city is Albacete.

The region largely occupies the southern half of the Iberian Peninsula's Inner Plateau, including large parts of the catchment areas of the Tagus, the Guadiana and the Júcar, while the northeastern relief comprises the Sistema Ibérico mountain massif.

It is bordered by Castile and León, Madrid, Aragon, Valencia, Murcia, Andalusia, and Extremadura. It is one of the most sparsely populated of Spain's regions. Albacete, Guadalajara, Toledo, Talavera de la Reina and Ciudad Real concentrate the largest urban areas in the region.

Geography 

Castilla–La Mancha is located in the middle of the Iberian peninsula, occupying the greater part of the Submeseta Sur, the vast plain composing the southern part of the Meseta Central. The Submeseta Sur (and the autonomous community) is separated from the Submeseta Norte (and the community of Castilla y León) by the mountain range known as the Sistema Central. Despite this, the region has no shortage of mountain landscapes: the southern slopes of the aforementioned Sistema Central in the north, the Sistema Ibérico in the northeast, and the Sierra Morena and Montes de Toledo in the south.

The regional urban structure is polycentric, with no dominant central city. Insofar the largest municipality (Albacete) is located in the peripheral southeast, Madrid (outside the region), exerts influence over the extension of the so-called  into the province of Guadalajara (including the provincial capital) as well as the north of the province of Toledo. The rest of urban centres lie on the central plains (with for example, the presence of intermediate agro-cities in La Mancha), contrasting with the sparsedly populated mountains and other peripheral areas.

Relief 
The Meseta is the dominant landscape unit of a great part of the territory of Castilla–La Mancha: a vast, uniform plain with little relief.

The west-to-east Montes de Toledo range cuts across the meseta separating the (northern) Tagus and the (southern) Guadiana drainage basins. The most outstanding peaks of this modest mountain range include La Villuerca and Rocigalgo.

In contrast, a more mountainous zone surrounds the Meseta and serves as the region's natural border. In the north of the Province of Guadalajara, bordering Madrid and Segovia, is a mountain range forming part of the Sistema Central, among which can be distinguished the mountain ranges Pela, Ayllón, Somosierra, Barahona and Ministra, with the headwaters of the rivers Jarama, Cañamares and Henares. The Sistema Central also penetrates the northwest of the Province of Toledo: a southwest to northeast sub-range known as the Sierra de San Vicente, bordered on the north by the Tiétar and on the south by the Alberche and the Tagus, rising up to its maximum heights at the summits of Cruces (1373 m), Pelados (1331 m) and San Vicente (1321 m).

On the northwest is the Sistema Ibérico, where there is important fluvial and especially karstic activity, which has given rise to such landscapes as the Ciudad Encantada, the Callejones de Las Majadas and the Hoces del Cabriel.

In the southeast is the ridge of the Sierra Morena, the southern border of the Meseta Central and the region's border with Andalusia. Within the Sierra Morena, distinction can be made between the Sierra Madrona, Sierra de Alcudia and Sierra de San Andrés. At the other southern extreme of Castilla–La Mancha, the Sierra de Alcaraz and Sierra del Segura form part of the Sistema Bético.

Hydrography 

The territory of Castilla–La Mancha is divided into five principal watersheds. The Tagus, Guadiana, and Guadalquivir drain into the Atlantic Ocean and the Júcar and Segura into the Mediterranean Sea. It includes the entire province of Guadalajara and the greater part of the province of Toledo, including the two largest cities of the latter province: the capital, Toledo, as well as Talavera de la Reina.

The Guadiana watershed extends  in Castilla–La Mancha, 37 percent of that river's entire watershed, with a population of 583,259 inhabitants. It includes the southern part of the province of Toledo, nearly all of the province of Ciudad Real (except the very south), the southwest of the province of Cuenca and the northwest of the province of Albacete. The Guadalquivir watershed extends over 5.2 percent of the surface area of the autonomous community, extending  through the southern parts of the provinces of Ciudad Real and Albacete, including such important population center as Puertollano.

It includes the eastern parts of the provinces of Cuenca and Albacete, including their respective capitals.

Climate 

Castilla–La Mancha has a continentalized Mediterranean climate: a Mediterranean climate with a marked character of a continental climate. The continentalized Mediterranean climate is similar to a typical Mediterranean climate, but with more extreme temperatures typical of a continental climate. Lack of a marine influence leads to much more extreme temperatures: hotter summers and quite cold winters, with a daily oscillation of 18.5 °C (33.3 °F).  Summer is the driest season, with temperatures often exceeding , sometimes reaching and exceeding . In winter, temperatures often drop below , producing frosts on clear nights, and occasional snow on cloudy nights.

Castilla–La Mancha is part of what has traditionally been called España Seca ("Dry Spain"). It receives relatively scarce precipitation, much as in a typical Mediterranean climate.

History

Early human history of the territory 
Prehistory and protohistory
The  presents material linked to the transition from earlier settlers to the Early Acheulean. Archaeological sites related to the Middle Acheulean in the current-day region lie on the Campo de Calatrava as well as in the source of the Villanueva river, the Guadiana catchment area and the Segura catchment area. The Upper Acheulean sites are mostly located within the limits of the current-day province of Ciudad Real, substantially increasing in number and territorial spread across the region for the ensuing Middle Paleolithic. The Upper Paleolithic in the region presents instances of the art of the Upper Paleolithic in the Serranía del Alto Tajo and the Upper Júcar. There are instances of Cardium pottery in Caudete from the Early Neolithic.

The natural region of La Mancha presents a number of archaeological sites related to the so-called Culture of Las Motillas of the Bronze Age, tentatively considered as the earliest reported case of human culture in Western Europe able to implement a system of underground water collection, whose installment is possibly connected to the surface water crisis caused by the 4.2 kiloyear event. A number of these Bronze Age settlements, the motillas, were built over Chalcolithic settlements.

During the Iron Age II (La Tène culture), the territory occupied by the current provinces of Ciudad Real and Albacete had a larger influence from Punic-Phoenician and Greek colonists, while the territory occupied by the current provinces of Toledo, Guadalajara and Cuenca was more influenced by the substrate of the earlier Atlantic Bronze, helping to line up the diffuse separation of two large groups of pre-Roman peoples ("Iberi" and "Celtiberi").

Iberian-related peoples dwelling the southern rim of the inner plateau such as the Oretani and Contestani were organised in tribes ruled by a kinglet or chieftain, each one controlling a number of settlements. The main cog of the Iberian form of settlement was the oppidum. From the 7th century BC onward, the Celtiberian settlements were characterised instead by the somewhat smaller castros.

Antiquity
In the 2nd century BC, by the time of the advent of the Roman conquest wars, the first actual cities had begun to grow in the inner plateau. The Roman conquest brought substantial transformations to the Carpetani urban settlements, including the social division between slaves and freemen, the monetary economy, the fostering of manufacture and trade or the new Roman acculturation.

Middle Ages history

Built from scratch on state initiative, the founding of the city of Reccopolis by Visigoths in the late 6th century was a singular development in the context of the European Early Middle Ages.

Following the 8th century Muslim conquest of the Iberian Peninsula, just after the 741 Berber Revolt, the so-called Middle March of Al-Andalus (al-Ťāğr al-Awsat) was created as territorial sub-division, existing for the rest of the ensuing emiral and caliphal period of Al-Andalus. During this era, the Middle March had eminently a military nature, both shielding the core of Al-Andalus from the raids of the Northern Christian polities as well as serving as staging ground for Muslim offensive campaigns against the former. Berber clans such as the Masmuda Banu-Salim (linked to the founders of Guadalajara) or the Hawwara Banu Zennun (based in the ) had an important role in the Muslim settlement of parts of the Middle March. The city of Toledo stood distinctly unruly towards the Cordobese authorities, and remained a major city of al-Andalus, preserving quite of its former importance and hosting a leading cultural centre that lasted even after the Christian conquest.

As consequence of the fitna of al-Andalus in the early 11th century, an independent polity with its center in Toledo (the Taifa of Toledo), emerged, roughly occupying the territory of the current-day provinces of Toledo, Ciudad Real, Guadalajara and Cuenca (as well as that of Madrid),

Following the Christian conquest of Toledo in 1085, the ensuing unsuccessful attempts by North-African Almoravids and Almohads to take the city turned the territory of the inner plateau south of the Tagus subject to extreme warfare for about a century and a half. The military insecurity south of the Tagus constrained the colonisation process undertaken by the new Castilian rulers. This underpinned the features of a sparse population in the region; as a result, ranching became a mainstay of the economy, which later led to the leading role of the military orders. The latter controlled over 20,000 km2 in the region of "La Mancha", managed from just 25 castles. The weak Christian grip over the territory collapsed after their crushing defeat from the Almohads in Alarcos (1195). Christian control south of the Tagus would only start to consolidate after the 1212 battle of Las Navas. The weak settlement and insecurity also allowed for countryside banditry (the so-called golfines) in the area of the Montes de Toledo until its progressive quelling, already effective by the late 13th century.

Despite a poorly representative degree of permeability, urban oligarchies in the current-day region during the Late Middle Ages were largely perpetuated by means of lineage, through inheritance and marriage. Following the ascension of the Trastámaras, the territory of the current-day province of Toledo underwent a process of seigneuralization, and a number of non-religious lordships were progressively created in the area. The 15th century also brought a growing importance of the political elites belonging to towns of the southern meseta in the affairs of the Crown of Castile relative to the prior uncontested preponderance of those elites from towns north of the Sistema Central.

Modern history

Throughout the 18th century, following the War of Spanish Succession, the Spanish Bourbon monarchs sought to equilibrate the commercial balance with the exterior carrying out an economic policy that tried to foster industrial capacity through economic interventionism. The State shall either stimulate the capacity of private capital or simply provide the capital itself.

The current provincial configuration roughly dates from the 1833 division by Javier de Burgos, establishing the outline of the modern provinces of Albacete, Ciudad Real, Cuenca, Guadalajara and Toledo, bar relatively minor later adjustments. Albacete was part, together with Murcia of a wider region, whereas Ciudad Real, Cuenca, Guadalajara, and Toledo formed a region together with the Province of Madrid, "New Castile". The justice administration stood in between the national and provincial levels of government (also unaligned with the purported regional classification insofar Albacete is concerned), with the audiencia of Albacete managing the provinces of Albacete, Cuenca and Ciudad Real, and the audiencia of Madrid managing the provinces of Toledo and Guadalajara (and that of Madrid).

The aforementioned modifications to the 1833 division include the party of Villena (lost by Albacete to Alicante in 1836), Requena (lost by Cuenca to Valencia in 1851), Villarrobledo (lost by Ciudad Real to Albacete circa 1846) or Valdeavero (lost by Guadalajara to Madrid in 1850). The provincial government institution was the provincial deputation.

The agrarian capitalism favoured by the bourgeoisie in the 19th century enshrined an economy based on cereal commodities and the primary sector, favouring the leveling of the reduced industrial activity—chiefly textile—in the territory corresponding to the current-day region, whereas mining output—with sites such of the mercury deposits in Almadén or the coal deposits in Puertollano—remained below potential. A silver rush broke out in the mining district around Hiendelaencina after 1844. Large-scale mining of lead and zinc in San Quintín (province of Ciudad Real) ensued in between 1884 and 1934. The arrival of railway transport in the mid 19th-century subordinated the interests of the provinces to those of Madrid and the Levante, although it fostered the development of some urban centres such as those of Alcázar de San Juan, Manzanares and Albacete. The five provinces lost relative demographic weight relative to the national total over the course of the century.

The territory of the current-day region was singularly affected by the desamortizaciones, particularly those of Mendizábal and Madoz. From 1836 to 1924  of land were auctioned (1,100,000 hectares of municipal properties and the rest church's property). They were purchased by the political and economic elites of the country.

Regionhood 
Under the auspices of the 1978 Constitution, a decree-law was issued on 15 November 1978, establishing the conditions of the "pre-autonomous regime" of the "Castilian-Manchegan region". A joint assembly of legislators and provincial deputies of the provinces of Albacete, Ciudad Real, Cuenca, Guadalajara, Toledo was established in Manzanares in 1981 to draft the early sketch of the regional statute. On 17 June 1982, the Congress of Deputies approved the final text of the regional statute (an organic law), which was later published on 16 August 1982, giving birth to the autonomous community of "Castilla-La Mancha". The constituent process of the autonomous community was sealed with the election of the first regional legislature in May 1983 and the ensuing investiture of José Bono as regional president. By December 1983 still less than half of citizens actually knew the autonomous community they belonged to.

Since its opening in 1979 the Tagus-Segura Water Transfer has caused a severe social-economic impact on the region, with the water resources available in the Tagus headwaters decreasing by about a 47.5% after 1980.

Regional divisions

...

Castilla–La Mancha is divided into 5 provinces named after their capital cities. The following category includes:
 Albacete
 Ciudad Real
 Cuenca
 Guadalajara
 Toledo

According to the official data of the INE, Castilla–La Mancha consists of 919 municipalities, which amount to 11.3 percent of all the municipalities in Spain. 496 of these have less than 500 inhabitants, 231 have between 501 and 2,000 inhabitants, 157 between 2,000 and 10,000 inhabitants, and only 35 have more than 10,000 inhabitants. The municipalities in the north are small and numerous, while in the south they are larger and fewer. This reflects different histories of how these sub-regions were repopulated during the Reconquista.

Official symbols 
The Organic Law 9/1982 (August 10, 1982), which is the Statute of Autonomy of Castilla–La Mancha established the flag of Castilla–La Mancha and the law 1/1983 (30 June 1983) established the coat of arms.

Flag 

Seven different designs for a flag were proposed during the era of the "pre-autonomous" region. The selected design was that of heraldist Ramón José Maldonado. This was made official in Article 5 of the Statute of Autonomy:
 One. The flag of the region consists of a rectangle divided vertically into two equal squares: the first, together with the mast, crimson red with a castle of Or masoned in sable and port and windows of azure; the second, white.
 Two. The flag of the region will fly at regional, provincial, or municipal public buildings, and will appear next to the Spanish flag, which will be displayed in the preeminent place; historic territories [provinces] may also be represented.

Coat of arms 

The coat of arms of Castilla–La Mancha is based on the flag of the region, and not the other way around, as is more typical in heraldry. Article 1 of the law 1/1983 describes it as follows:

The coat of arms of the Communities of Castilla–La Mancha is party per pale. On the dexter [the statute literally says "On the first quarter"], on a field gules a castle Or, embattled, port and windows of azure and masoned sable. On the sinister [the statute literally says "The second quarter"], a field argent. On the crest, a royal crown enclosed, which is a circle of Or crimped with precious gems, composed of eight finials, of Acanthus mollis, five visible, topped by pearls and whose leaves emerge from diadems, which converge in a globe of azure or blue, with a semimeridian and the equator Or topped by a cross Or. The crown lined with gules or red.

Some institutions of the region have adopted this coat of arms as part of their own emblem, among these the Cortes of Castilla–La Mancha, the Consultative Council and the University of Castilla–La Mancha.

Anthem 
Although Article 5 of the Statute of Autonomy indicates that the region will have its own anthem, after more than 25 years no such anthem has been adopted. Among the proposed anthems have been the "Canción del Sembrador" ("Song of the Sower") from the zarzuela La rosa del azafrán by Jacinto Guerrero, the "Canto a la Mancha" ("Song of La Mancha") by Tomás Barrera, and many others, such as one presented by a group of citizens from Villarrobledo with the title "Patria sin fin" ("Fatherland without end").

Government and administration 
Article 8 of the Statute of Autonomy states that the powers of the region are exercised through the Junta of Communities of Castilla–La Mancha (Junta de Comunidades de Castilla–La Mancha). Organs of the Junta are the Cortes of Castilla–La Mancha, the President of the Junta and the Council of Government.

Cortes of Castilla–La Mancha 

The Cortes of Castilla–La Mancha represent the popular will through 33 deputies elected by universal adult suffrage through the secret ballot. They are elected for a term of four years under a proportional system intended to guarantee representation to the various territorial zones of Castilla–La Mancha. The electoral constituency is at the level of each province, with provinces being assigned the following number of deputies as of 2009: Albacete, 6; Ciudad Real, 8; Cuenca, 5; Guadalajara, 5; and Toledo, 9. Article 10 of the Statute of Autonomy states that elections will be convoked by the President of the Junta of Communities, following the General Electoral Regime (Régimen Electoral General), on the fourth Sunday in May every four years. This stands in contrast to the autonomous communities of the Basque Country, Catalonia, Galicia, Andalusia and the Valencian Community  where the president has the power to convoke elections at any time. (In the Valencian Community that power has never been exercised. Elections there have, in practice, taken place on a four-year cycle.)

Since the Spanish regional elections of 2015, the Cortes of Castilla–La Mancha has consisted of 16 deputies from the conservative People's Party, 15 from the socialist PSOE and 2 from the left-wing Podemos. The Cortes sits in the former Franciscan convent in Toledo, the Edificio de San Gil ("San Gil building").

Council of Government 
The Council of Government is the collegial executive organ of the region. It directs regional political and administrative action, exercises an executive function and regulatory powers under the Spanish Constitution of 1978, the Statute of Autonomy, and the laws of the nation and region. The Council of Government consists of the president, vice presidents (if any) and the Councilors.

President of the Junta 

The President of the Junta directs the Council of Government and coordinates the functions of its members. The president is elected by the Cortes from among its members, then formally named by the monarch of Spain. The president's official residence is the Palace of Fuensalida in Toledo.

Demography 
Large parts of the region are experiencing a demographic decline. In contrast, besides the provincial capitals, two specific areas bordering the Madrid region associated to the Madrid metropolitan area have experienced a population growth well above the national average: La Sagra (around the A-42 highway) and the Henares Corridor (around the A-2). Overall, as of 2016, the NUTS-2 region of Castilla–La Mancha featured an average index of demographic vulnerability of 30, similar to those of the European regions of Upper Palatinate (Germany), Styria (Austria), Catalonia (Spain), Overijssel (Netherlands) and Campania (Italy).

Number of inhabitants
According to the official 11 January 2008 data of the INE Castilla–La Mancha has 2,043,100 inhabitants in its five provinces. Despite being the third largest of Spains communities by surface area (after Castilla y León and Andalusia), it is only the ninth most populous. Castilla–La Mancha has just 4.4 percent of Spain's population.

Population density

Composition of population by age and sex
The population pyramid of Castilla–La Mancha is typical for a developed region, with the central zone wider than the base or the upper zone. The population between 16 and 44 years of age represents about 44 percent, from 45 to 64 about 21.3 percent, with those 15 and under constituting 15 percent and those over 65, 18 percent. These data show the progressive aging of the castellanomanchego population.

The region has about 9,000 more males than females; in percentage terms, 50.3 percent versus 49.7 percent. This is opposite to Spain as a whole, where women constitute 50.8 percent of the population.

Birth rate, death rate, life expectancy
According to 2006 INE numbers, the birth rate in Castilla–La Mancha is 10.21 per thousand inhabitants, lower than the national average of 10.92 per thousand. The death rate is 8.83 per thousand inhabitants, higher than the national average of 8.42 per thousand.

Life expectancy at birth is one of the highest in Spain: 83.67 years for women and 77.99 years for men.

Foreign population 

As of 2018, the region had a foreign population of 163,820. Most of the foreigners had Romanian or Moroccan citizenship.

Urban areas 
The 2020 report on urban areas in Spain published by the Ministry of Transports, Mobility and Urban Agenda identifies among the urban areas in the region (with population data referring to 2019) those of Albacete (173,329), Guadalajara (161,683), Toledo (123,509), Talavera de la Reina (94,028), Ciudad Real (90,114), Cuenca (54,690) and Puertollano (47,035).

Economy

Castilla–La Mancha generates a GDP of €33,077,484,000, 3.4 percent of the Spanish GDP, placing it ninth among the 19 Spanish autonomous communities. GDP has been roughly 3.4 percent of the national GDP since at least 2000. A per capita GDP of €17,339 places Castilla–La Mancha 17th among the 19 communities, with only Andalusia and Extremadura having lower per capita GDP; the national average is €22,152. Nonetheless, in the early to mid-1990s, Sonseca in the province of Toledo several times had the highest per capita income in Spain.

As of 2017, the regional gross value added structure is as follows: 

According to the statistics of the INE's Encuesta de Población Activa for the first trimester of 2007, the active work force of Castilla–La Mancha numbered 896,513 persons, of whom 827,113 were employed and 69,900 unemployed, giving a workforce density of 55.5 percent of the population and an unemployment rate of 7.7 percent.

Agriculture and husbandry 
Agriculture and husbandry, still the foundation of the local economy, constitutes 11.6 percent of regional GDP, and employs 9.9 percent of the active workforce.

Fifty-two percent of the soil of Castilla–La Mancha is considered "dry". Agricultural activities have historically been based on the cultivation of wheat (37.0 percent), grapes (17.2 percent) and olives (6.6 percent). The vineyards are predominantly, but by no means exclusively, in the west and southwest of La Mancha. In 2005 the region produced  of grapes, constituting 53.4 percent of Spain's national production. After grapes, the next most important agricultural product is barley, 25.0 percent of the national total.

As of 2014, the region (primarily areas in the provinces of Cuenca and Albacete) was by far the largest producer of garlic in Spain, which was in turn the largest producer country in Europe. Black truffle is produced in areas of the provinces of Guadalajara, Cuenca and Albacete. The overwhelming majority of the saffron produced in Spain (97%) originates from the region.

The region concentrates the 81% of pistachio-cultivated area in the country, which increased fortyfold in a decade becoming the first European producer and fifth worldwide in the early 2020s.

In terms of agricultural productivity and income, since Spain's incorporation into the European Union (EU) the primary sector of the regional economy has evolved dynamically. Among the reasons for this are growth rates higher than the national average, as well as increased capitalization fostering specialization and modernization, including the integration an externalization of the sector, whereby activities previously performed on the farm are now performed elsewhere. These changes have been fostered by the regional articulation of the EU's Common Agricultural Policy. Since 1986, subsidies have played a significant role in this sector.

Animal husbandry plays a lesser, but not negiglible, role in the regional economy. 2005 statistics show 3,430,501 head of sheep, 1,602,576 pigs, 405,778 goats and 309,672 cattle; these last produce  of milk each year.

Apiculture (bee-keeping) is another significant part of the primary sector output, with 190,989 hives as of 4 October 2017.

Industry and construction 

Traditionally, Castilla–La Mancha has had little industrial production, due to several factors among which are low population density and a shortage of qualified workers. However, since Spain's incorporation into the EU, there has been much progress. Industry has been growing as a sector of the regional economy at a faster pace than nationally. July 2006 figures show the region as third among the autonomous communities in the rate of growth of the industrial sector. Regional industrial GDP grew 2.8 percent in 2000–2005, compared to 1 percent nationally for the same period.

The greatest obstacles to industrial growth in the region have been:
 Lack of a dense business fabric.
 Undersized industrial enterprises.
 Little specialization of labor.
 Little investment in R & D.
 Poor infrastructure with respect to services to enterprises.
 Little export orientation.
 Inadequate marketing channels and distribution for regional products.

The principal industrial areas within the region are Sonseca and its comarca, the Henares Corridor, Puertollano, Talavera de la Reina, La Sagra y Almansa, as well as all of the provincial capitals.

As throughout Spain in recent decades, the construction sector is one of the strongest. It employs 15.6 percent of the work force and produces 10.1 percent of regional GDP. It is one of the fastest-growing sectors of the economy: growth in 2006 was 13.6 percent. Most of the construction sector, is housing, including a new city of 30,000 inhabitants, Ciudad Valdeluz in Yebes, Guadalajara; 13,000 dwellings in Seseña, Toledo and the Reino de Don Quijote complex in the province of Ciudad Real, with 9,000 dwellings and 4,000 hotel beds.

As of 2019, the regional defence industry ranks third in Spain after those of Madrid and Andalusia, with a 5.8% share of sales. The bulk of the defence industry lies in cities such as Illescas, Toledo, Cedillo, Valdepeñas, Puertollano, Ciudad Real or Albacete. The Airbus Group is present in Illescas since 1992 and in Albacete (Airbus Helicopters) since 2005.

Energy 

Although wind energy and solar energy have been playing increasingly important roles in Castilla–La Mancha, the majority of the energy generated in the region comes from the region's large thermal power stations: the Elcogas Thermal Power Station (owned by Elcogas) and Puertollano Thermal Power Station (owned by E.ON) in Puertollano as well as the Aceca Thermal Power Station in Villaseca de la Sagra (owned by Iberdrola and Unión Fenosa)

Castilla–La Mancha is also the home of the Trillo Nuclear Power Plant near Trillo, Guadalajara.

Existing solar thermal power plants (all using a parabolic trough collector) in the region include Manchasol-1 and Manchasol-2 in Alcázar de San Juan (49.9 and 50 MW respectively), Helios 1 and Helios 2 in Puerto Lápice (50 MW each), Ibersol Ciudad Real in Puertollano (50 MW).

Regarding photovoltaic power plants, Picón I, Picón II and Picón III (50 MW each), located in Porzuna, were put into operation in 2019.

Mining 
The region is rich in mineral resources, particularly the south, and they have been exploited since Antiquity.

As of 2018, with 270 active mining sites (only one of them an underground mine), most of the extractive sector is dedicated to aggregates, clays, plasters and other mineral products, accounting for a 10.15% of active sites in Spain.

Recent mining projects brought forward by the regional government in the province of Ciudad Real, rich in a number of strategic minerals, include those of tungsten (in between Almodóvar del Campo and Abenójar), phosphates (in Fontanarejo), and titanium and zirconium (in between Puebla de Don Rodrigo and Arroba de los Montes), but their final authorisations pend on satisfactory environmental impact statements, and they have also met the opposition from environmental organisations.

Service sector 

The majority of the regional workforce—55.5 percent—is employed in the service sector, generating 49.8 percent of regional GDP, according to Economic and Social Council of Castilla–La Mancha (Consejo Económico y Social de Castilla–La Mancha, CES) data for 2006. Although a large sector of the regional economy, it is small by national standards: 67.2 percent of employment in Spain is in the service sector. Counted in the service sector are commerce, tourism, hospitality, finance, public administration, and administration of other services related to culture and leisure.

The Madrid's urban decongestion has favoured the development of logistics businesses and platforms in Azuqueca de Henares and Illescas, which neighbor the Madrid region.

In the area of tourism, there has been a great deal of growth, with Castilla–La Mancha becoming in recent decades one of the principal tourist destinations in the Spanish interior. During 2006 the region had more than 2 million tourists (3 percent more than the previous year) for a total of 3,500,000 overnight hotel stays. Rural tourism increased 14 percent in overnight stays in a single year. From 2000 to 2005 the number of hotel beds increased 26.4 percent to 17,245 beds in 254 hotels. In the same period, the number of casas rurales (for farm stays) increased 148 percent to 837 and the number of beds in such facilities 175 percent to 5,751.

Health 

The Servicio de Salud de Castilla–La Mancha (SESCAM, "Health Service of Castilla–La Mancha"), part of the Consejería de Salud y Bienestar Social ("Council of Health and Social Welfare") is the entity in charge of health in Castilla–La Mancha. It is an integral part of Spain's National Health System, based on universal coverage, equal access, and public financing.

For the purposes of healthcare provision, the region is divided in 8 health areas (Albacete, la Mancha Centro, Guadalajara, Ciudad Real, Cuenca, Talavera de la Reina, Toledo, and Puertollano). Those are further subdivided in basic health zones.

Education 

The Junta of Castilla–La Mancha assumed responsibility for education in the autonomous community as of January 1, 2000, directly managing over 1,000 schools, with 22,000 teachers and 318,000 students. In the 2006–2007 school year, the region had 324,904 students below the university level, of whom 17.7 percent were in private schools. In that same year, the region had 1,037 schools and 30,172 schoolteachers; 15.2 percent of the schools were private.

The decentralized University of Castilla–La Mancha was formally established in 1982 and has operated since 1985.
There are four main campuses, one each at Albacete, Ciudad Real, Cuenca and Toledo, with classes also offered in Almadén, Talavera de la Reina and Puertollano. The university offers 54 degree programs (titulaciones). The province of Guadalajara stands outside the regional university, with its own University of Alcalá offering degrees in education, business, tourism, technical architecture, and nursing. The National University of Distance Education also offers services in the region through five affiliated centers, one in each province: Albacete (with an extension in Almansa), Valdepeñas, Cuenca, Guadalajara, and Talavera de la Reina. Finally, the Menéndez Pelayo International University has a location in Cuenca.

In the 2005–06 school year, the region had 30,632 students enrolled at universities, down 1.0 percent from the previous year.

Historically, the region has had other universities, but these no longer exist. The present University of Castilla–La Mancha uses one of the buildings of the Royal University of Toledo (1485–1807). Other former universities in the region were the Royal and Pontifical University of Our Lady of Rosario in Almagro (1550–1807) and the University of San Antonio de Porta Coeli in Sigüenza founded in the 15th century by Cardinal Pedro González de Mendoza and, like the others, closed in the Napoleonic era.

Transportation

Highways 
The most heavily trafficked of these are the radial routes surrounding Madrid and the routes in and out of the city, but there are also routes within Castilla–La Mancha, and national and international routes that pass through the province, including highways in the International E-road network.

The regional government put into action a Plan Regional de Autovías with the objective that all municipalities with 10,000 or more inhabitants would be connected to an autovía. If it is completed, 96 percent of the region's population will live within 15 minutes of a high-capacity road. Among the developed projects of this plan are:
 Autovía de los Viñedos,  connecting Toledo and Tomelloso (completely in service).
 Autovía de la Sagra,  connecting the Autovía A-5 with the Autovía A-4 (Tranches I and II under way, duplication of highway CM-4001 in the tendering of works phase).
 Autovía del IV Centenario,  departs Ciudad Real to meet with the future Autovía Linares-Albacete (A-32), passing through Valdepeñas (first phase partially under way, second currently being studied).
 Autovía del Júcar, will connect Albacete to Cuenca (in project).
 Autovía de la Alcarria: although initially contemplated in the Plan Regional de Autovías, the Ministry of Development has taken over the work. It will connect the Autovía del Este (Autovía A-4) with the Autovía del Nordeste (Autovía A-2) (currently being studied).

Railways 
Renfe, Spain's state-owned railway operator operates numerous trains throughout Castilla–La Mancha.

Long distance
Numerous long-distance rail lines (líneas de largo recorrido) pass through Castilla–La Mancha, most of them radiating out of Madrid. Some of these are high-velocity trains (Alta Velocidad Española AVE):

High velocity AVE trains

 Madrid–Ciudad Real–Puertollano–Córdoba–Seville).
 Madrid–Toledo
 Madrid–Guadalajara–Zaragoza–Barcelona.
 Madrid–Cuenca–Albacete–Valencia (in project).
 Madrid–Toledo (La Sagra)–Talavera de la Reina–Navalmoral de la Mata–Plasencia–Fuentidueñas–Cáceres–Mérida–Badajoz–Lisbon (in project).

Normal Largo Recorrido trains
 Alicante–Albacete–Alcázar de San Juan–Ciudad Real
 Madrid–Ciudad Real–Jaén
 Madrid–Ciudad Real–Badajoz
 Madrid–Cuenca–Valencia
 Madrid–Guadalajara–Soria
 Madrid–Guadalajara–Arcos de Jalón
 Madrid–Talavera de la Reina–Badajoz

Local trains
Two local commuter rail lines out of Madrid (Cercanías Madrid) pass through Castilla–La Mancha. The C-2 line stops in Azuqueca de Henares in the province of Guadalajara and in the city of Guadalajara itself. The C-3 to Aranjuez used to stop at Seseña, but service to that station was discontinued in April 2007.

Airports 
Air transport is marginal in the region. Castilla–La Mancha has two airports, the Albacete Airport (no cargo transport and with an insignificant civilian use) and the Ciudad Real Central Airport, which was affected by the 2008 crisis and closed in 2012, although efforts have been pursued to reactivate the latter. Relatively close airports outside the region include those in Madrid, Valencia and Alicante.

Culture

Heritage protection 

The region hosts several World Heritage Sites: Toledo (since 1986), Cuenca (since 1996) and Almadén (together with the Slovenian town of Idrija under the Heritage of Mercury. Almadén and Idrija joint site) since 2012.

As of 2020, the region features 644 bienes de interés cultural (BIC) across the 5 provinces: Albacete (92), Ciudad Real (108), Cuenca (99), Guadalajara (104) and Toledo (238) plus another 3 transcending the provincial borders.

The regional legislation in force concerning the cultural heritage dates from 2013. Restrictions on the modification of historical buildings or the use of metal detectors were introduced then.

See also

 Manchego cuisine

Informational notes

References

Bibliography

External links

 Official Web Site of Castile–La Mancha
 Government of Castile–La Mancha
 Statistics Institute of Castile–La Mancha
 University of Castilla–La Mancha
 Diario de la Mancha
 Regional Meteorological Institute of Castile–La Mancha
 Innovation in Castile–La Mancha Web Site
 Castile-La Mancha on About-Spain.net
 Surface area of municipalities in Castile–La Mancha

 
NUTS 2 statistical regions of the European Union
States and territories established in 1982
Autonomous communities of Spain
1982 establishments in Spain